Bartlett B. Sher (born March 27, 1959) is an American theatre director. The New York Times has described him as "one of the most original and exciting directors, not only in the American theater but also in the international world of opera". Sher has been nominated for nine Tony Awards, winning a Tony Award for Best Direction of a Musical for the 2008 Broadway revival of South Pacific.

He's directed revivals of classic mid-century musicals on Broadway at Lincoln Center, which include South Pacific (2008), The King and I (2015), My Fair Lady (2018), and Camelot (2023). He also directed the plays Oslo (2017), To Kill a Mockingbird (2018), and Pictures From Home (2023).

Early life
Sher was born in San Francisco, California, USA, the son of Aird (Stewart) and Joseph Sher. He had six siblings, including a twin brother, Bradley. He was raised Catholic (during his teenage years, he found out that his Lithuanian-born father was Jewish). Sher attended St. Ignatius College Preparatory and later the College of the Holy Cross in Worcester, Massachusetts. He returned to St. Ignatius to teach English and run the theatre program. During the 1984 Los Angeles Olympic Games he was influenced by the arts programs associated with the Games, particularly by the work of Polish director Tadeusz Kantor.

Career
Sher served as associate artistic director at Hartford Stage (Hartford, Connecticut) and company director at the Guthrie Theater (Minneapolis, Minnesota) where he worked with Garland Wright, who was a mentor as was Robert Woodruff.  Sher has directed, taught and led workshops across the country and internationally. He was artistic director at Intiman Theatre in Seattle and in 2008 was named resident director at Lincoln Center Theater in New York City.

Intiman Playhouse, Seattle
Sher served as artistic director at Intiman Playhouse in Seattle from 2000 to 2010. During 2010 Sher handed over this job to his successor, Kate Whoriskey. (The Intiman cancelled its 2011 season due to financial problems.) His productions at Intiman have included:

 Nickel and Dimed, a world premiere by Joan Holden based on the book by Barbara Ehrenreich;
 Tony Kushner's Homebody/Kabul (British housewife becomes fascinated with Afghanistan);
 Ingmar Bergman's Nora (adaptation of Henrik Ibsen's A Doll's House );
 G. B. Shaw's Arms and the Man;
 Shakespeare's Cymbeline and Titus Andronicus;
 Carlo Goldoni's The Servant of Two Masters ;
 Works by Craig Lucas:
The Dying Gaul (a funny and tragic story of a grieving Hollywood scriptwriter)
The Singing Forest (neurotics and therapists sparring) — world premiere
Prayer for My Enemy (dysfunctional family, friendship, war in Iraq)
The Light in the Piazza, book by Lucas (a chance meeting in Florence leads to romance)

Other theatre and opera
At the Theatre for a New Audience (TFANA) in New York, Sher directed productions of Waste by Harley Granville Barker in 2000 (its American premiere, winning the 2000 Obie Award for Best Play), Cymbeline by Shakespeare in 2002, Dom Juan by Molière in 2003, and Pericles, Prince of Tyre by Shakespeare in 2004. He directed Cymbeline, Dom Juan, and Pericles at the Brooklyn Academy of Music. In 2006 Sher directed Gioachino Rossini's Il barbiere di Siviglia (The Barber of Seville) at the Metropolitan Opera in Lincoln Center. In 2009 Sher directed the opera Tales of Hoffmann at the Metropolitan Opera in New York (opening December 3, 2009). In 2011, Sher directed Mourning Becomes Electra for Seattle Opera. In March 2011, Le Comte Ory by Rossini opened at the Metropolitan Opera in New York, in a production directed by Sher. The reviewer for The New York Times called the production "lively, colorful and inventive." In June 2011, Sher's production of the world premiere of Nico Muhly's Two Boys was presented at the English National Opera. The American debut took place in October 2013, at the Metropolitan Opera in New York. The Met commissioned the production.

Broadway and Lincoln Center 
Sher made his Broadway debut in 2005 when his production of The Light in the Piazza which had originated at the Intiman Playhouse premiered at the Vivian Beaumont Theatre. Sher received Tony Award nominations for The Light in the Piazza and a 2006 revival of Awake and Sing!, winning the Tony Award for Best Direction of a Musical for the 2008 Broadway revival of South Pacific. He received another Tony nomination for the 2009 revival of Joe Turner's Come and Gone. In 2010 Sher directed a musical production of Women on the Verge of a Nervous Breakdown based on the 1988 film by Pedro Almodóvar. The show opened November 4, 2010 on Broadway in a Lincoln Center Theater production. The musical was criticized by Ben Brantley of The New York Times as being distracted, gimmicky and overdesigned. A previously announced revival of Funny Girl that Sher was expected to direct with a Broadway opening in February 2012 was ultimately postponed.

In December 2012, Golden Boy by Clifford Odets as directed by Sher opened in New York to a positive review in The New York Times. This production was staged at the Belasco Theatre, the same spot where Golden Boy was first presented on Broadway, 75 years earlier. The production received eight Tony Award nominations, including Sher's fifth for directing. Sher had directed Odets' Awake and Sing! in 2006. The production ran from December 2012 into January 2013 for 53 performances. In 2014 Sher directed a musical production of the novel The Bridges of Madison County. The production ran for 100 performances from February to May 2014.

Sher directed a Broadway revival of The King and I, which opened at the Vivian Beaumont Theatre at Lincoln Center on April 16, 2015, with Kelli O'Hara as Anna Leonowens, Ken Watanabe as The King of Siam, and Ruthie Anne Miles as Lady Tiang. He received a 2015 Tony Award nomination for Best Direction of a Musical, and the production received Tony Awards for Best Revival of a Musical, Best Actress in a Musical (O'Hara), Best Featured Actress in a Musical (Miles) and Best Costume Design of a Musical (Catherine Zuber). Sher directed a Broadway revival of Fiddler on the Roof, starring Danny Burstein as Tevye and Jessica Hecht as Golde, which opened at the Broadway Theatre on December 17, 2015 and played its final performance December 31, 2016.

Sher directed the world premiere of J.T. Roger's play Oslo which opened at the Mitzi Newhouse Theater in July 2016.  The production transferred to the Vivian Beaumont Theater for an open run in April 2017. Sher directed the 2021 television film adaptation of Oslo. Sher received Tony Award nominations for Oslo, a 2018 revival of My Fair Lady, and the 2018 play adaptation of To Kill a Mockingbird. In 2023, it was announced that he would direct the stage musical adaptation of Damien Chazelle's 2016 film La La Land.

Personal life
Sher lives in Manhattan with his wife Kristin Flanders (a Yale trained actress) and two daughters. His father, an insurance broker whom he described to The New York Times as a "brilliant businessman, very charismatic", was also a serial philanderer who had a second family with another woman. Sher's childhood was marked by a drawn-out divorce.

His mother soon met a Chinese-American man, Doug Chung, who moved in, helped rear the family and brought them much needed stability. Sher's experiences with interracial blended families informed his directing of South Pacific.

Credits

Musicals

Plays

Awards and nominations

Other recognition 
In 2017, Sher received the Golden Plate Award of the American Academy of Achievement presented by Awards Council member Jeremy Irons.

In 2017, The New York Pops celebrated its 34th birthday with a gala honoring Sher and Kelli O'Hara.

See also
 Tony Award for Best Direction of a Play — 2006 nomination (Awake and Sing!), 2009 nomination (Joe Turner's Come and Gone), 2013 nomination (Golden Boy), 2017 nomination (Oslo), and 2019 nomination (To Kill a Mockingbird)
 Tony Award for Best Direction of a Musical — 2005 nomination (The Light in the Piazza), 2008 winner (South Pacific), 2015 nomination (The King and I), and 2018 nomination (My Fair Lady)

Further reading

References

External links
 
 
 Intiman Theatre website
 Lincoln Center Theater website
 Charlie Rose interview with Bartlett Sher, May 19, 2008

1959 births
American musical theatre directors
American people of Lithuanian-Jewish descent
Artistic directors
College of the Holy Cross alumni
Living people
People from San Francisco
American opera directors